Darrick Joseph Brilz (born February 14, 1964) is a former American football offensive lineman in the National Football League for the Washington Redskins, San Diego Chargers, Seattle Seahawks, and the Cincinnati Bengals.  He played college football at Oregon State University.

References

1964 births
Living people
American football offensive guards
American football centers
Cincinnati Bengals players
Oregon State Beavers football players
San Diego Chargers players
Seattle Seahawks players
Washington Redskins players